Colastes is a genus of braconid wasps in the family Braconidae. There are at least 80 described species in Colastes.

The genus Shawiana has been recently treated as a subgenus of Colastes.

Species
The following 87 species belong to the genus Colastes:

 Colastes abdominalis Belokobylskij, 1986 c g
 Colastes abnormis (Wesmael, 1838) c g
 Colastes abrogatus (Brues, 1910) c g
 Colastes aciculatus Tobias, 1986 c g
 Colastes adjunctus Belokobylskij, 1998 c g
 Colastes affinis (Wesmael, 1838) c
 Colastes alaskensis (Ashmead, 1902) c g
 Colastes alboapicalis Belokobylskij, 1988 c g
 Colastes amoenus Belokobylskij, 2000 c g
 Colastes anervis Belokobylskij, 1992 c g
 Colastes anomalopterus (Spinola, 1851) c g
 Colastes attonita (Papp, 1987) c g
 Colastes avatsha Belokobylskij, 1998 c g
 Colastes baikalicus Belokobylskij, 1998 c g
 Colastes bohayicus Belokobylskij, 1996 c g
 Colastes borealis (Walley, 1936) c g
 Colastes braconius Haliday, 1833 c g
 Colastes brevipetiolatus Tobias, 1986 c g
 Colastes catenator (Haliday, 1836) c g
 Colastes cilipennis (Cameron, 1910) c g
 Colastes cognatus Belokobylskij, 1992 c g
 Colastes colenutti (Cockerell, 1921) c g
 Colastes cribellatus (Spinola, 1851) c g
 Colastes curtifemur Zaykov & Basamakov, 1984 c g
 Colastes dersu Belokobylskij, 1998 c g
 Colastes distractus (Cockerell, 1921) c g
 Colastes effectus (Papp, 1972) c g
 Colastes elongatus Belokobylskij, 1998 c g
 Colastes flavitarsis (Thomson, 1892) c g
 Colastes foveolator (Thomson, 1892) c g
 Colastes fragilis (Haliday, 1836) c g
 Colastes fritzeni van Achterberg & Shaw, 2008 c g
 Colastes grenadensis Ashmead, 1895 c g
 Colastes himalayicus Belokobylskij, 2000 c g
 Colastes hopkinsi (Ashmead, 1900) c
 Colastes hungaricus (Szepligeti, 1906) c
 Colastes incertus (Wesmael, 1838) c g
 Colastes inopinatus Belokobylskij, 2000 c g
 Colastes insularis Belokobylskij, 1984 c g
 Colastes interdictus Belokobylskij, 1998 c g
 Colastes involutus Belokobylskij, 1992 c g
 Colastes ivani Belokobylskij, 1986 c g
 Colastes kiefferi (Nomine, 1938) c g
 Colastes kurilensis Belokobylskij, 1996 c g
 Colastes laevis (Thomson, 1892) c g
 Colastes lapponicus (Thomson, 1892) c g
 Colastes laticarpus (Thomson, 1892) c g
 Colastes longitergum Belokobylskij, 1988 c g
 Colastes luridiceps (Vachal, 1908) c g
 Colastes lustrator (Haliday, 1836) c g
 Colastes macropterus Belokobylskij, 1992 c g
 Colastes magdalenae Sterzynski, 1983 c g
 Colastes malayensis Belokobylskij, 1992 c g
 Colastes melanocephalus (Spinola, 1851) c g
 Colastes mellipes (Provancher, 1880) c
 Colastes mendax Belokobylskij, 1992 c g
 Colastes metalli (Muesebeck, 1932) c g
 Colastes moldavicus Tobias, 1986 c g
 Colastes montanus (Tobias & Belokobylskij, 1986) c
 Colastes nuptus Papp, 1983 c g
 Colastes opacus Belokobylskij, 1992 c g
 Colastes orchesiae (Ashmead, 1889) c g
 Colastes orientalis Belokobylskij, 1998 c g
 Colastes pacificus Belokobylskij, 1998 c g
 Colastes pahangensis Belokobylskij, 2000 c g
 Colastes phyllotomae (Muesebeck, 1932) c g
 Colastes pilosiventris Belokobylskij, 1988 c g
 Colastes pilosus Belokobylskij, 1984 c g
 Colastes polypori Mason, 1968 c g
 Colastes postfurcalis Belokobylskij, 2000 c g
 Colastes propinquus (Walley, 1936) c g
 Colastes pubescens Belokobylskij, 1986 c g
 Colastes pubicornis (Thomson, 1892) c g
 Colastes rupicola Belokobylskij, 1998 c g
 Colastes sandei van Achterberg & Shaw, 2008 c g
 Colastes santacheza Belokobylskij, 1998 c g
 Colastes subquadratus Papp, 1975 c g
 Colastes sylvicola Belokobylskij, 1998 c g
 Colastes taegeri Belokobylskij, 1995 c g
 Colastes tamdaoensis Belokobylskij, 1992 c g
 Colastes testaceus Brèthes, 1924 c g
 Colastes tobiasi Belokobylskij, 1998 c g
 Colastes tricolor (Szépligeti, 1908) c g
 Colastes unicolor Belokobylskij, 1984 c g
 Colastes ussuricus Belokobylskij, 1996 c g
 Colastes vividus Papp, 1975 c g
 Colastes whartoni Belokobylskij, 1992 c g

Data sources: i = ITIS, c = Catalogue of Life, g = GBIF, b = Bugguide.net

References

Further reading

 
 
 

Parasitic wasps